Tinline Bay is a cove and beach located within The  Abel Tasman National Park in the South Island of New Zealand.

It is located approximately 2 kilometres from the entrance to the park near Mārahau and is the southern start of The Abel Tasman Inland Track.  A sandy beach,  it is a popular stopping off point for hikers, and for kayakers from the Tasman Sea. It is also the site of a Department of Conservation campsite.

References

Bays of the Tasman District
Beaches of the Tasman District
Tasman Bay